Q63 may refer to:
 Q63 (New York City bus)
 Al-Munafiqun, a surah of the Quran
 , an auxiliary ship of the Argentine Navy